Opposing Views is a public-affairs program produced by Solar News and Current Affairs and broadcast by Solar News Channel since August 2, 2013. It is hosted by attorney Rod Nepomunceno.

See also
 List of programs broadcast by Solar News Channel

External links
 

Philippine television news shows
CNN Philippines original programming
Solar News and Current Affairs
English-language television shows
2013 Philippine television series debuts
2015 Philippine television series endings